Jesús Puras Vidal de la Peña (born March 16 1963), also known as 'Chus Puras', is a Spanish rally driver active in the World Rally Championship from 1991 to 2002. Puras was well known for his blistering performances on tarmac rallies.

Career

Puras debuted in rallying in 1982 and captured the Spanish Rally Championship title eight times; in 1990 and 1992 with a Lancia Delta Integrale 16V, in 1995 and 1997 with a Citroën ZX 16S, from 1998 to 2000 with a Citroën Xsara Kit Car and in 2002 with a Citroën Xsara WRC. Driving a Ford Escort RS Cosworth, he also won the 1994 FIA Group N Cup (now as World Rally Championship-3).

Along with teammate Philippe Bugalski, he was chosen by the Citroën Total World Rally Team to be part of their driver line-up for the first bit-part campaign with the Citroën Xsara Kit Car in 1999. He secured his only WRC win at the 2001 Tour de Corse with co-driver Marc Martí (who then went on to pilot former double world champion Carlos Sainz and in recent years, Dani Sordo) with the Citroën Xsara WRC.

However, with performances overshadowed by the upcoming Sébastien Loeb, he retired from the Citroën factory team and the WRC in 2002, ending with a sixth place in his last rally – the 2002 Rallye Sanremo.

WRC victories

WRC results

References

External links

Puras at the World Rally Archive

1963 births
Living people
Sportspeople from Santander, Spain
World Rally Championship drivers
Rally drivers from Cantabria
Spanish rally drivers
Dakar Rally drivers
Citroën Racing drivers